Karoline (Hebrew: Chaile) Kaulla née Raphael, known foremost as 'Madame Kaulla' or '"Kiefe" Auerbacher' (1739, in Buchau am Federsee – 18 March 1809, in Hechingen), was a German banker. She was one of the most famous Court Jews of her time, and reputed to have been the richest woman in Germany.

Life

Early life
Karoline Kaulla was the daughter of the banker Yitzchak (Isaak) Raphael and Rifka Wasserman. She was the sister of Raphael Kaulla. Her father was Court Jew for the house of Hohenzollern. In 1757, she married Akiva Auerbach.

Business career

In 1768, Karoline Kaulla was appointed court factor to the court of Fürstenberg of Donaueschingen. She provided the court in Donaueschingen with horses, silver, jewellery and other expensive goods.

In 1770, she became court factor for the Duke of Wuerttemberg in Stuttgart.

She functioned as the treasurer at the Royal Württemberg Court, and leader of the Trading House Kaulla in Stuttgart. She was a co-founder of the Royal Württemberg Court Bank, which after many fusions resulted in the Deutsche Bank in the 1920s.

She is reputed to have been a beautiful, impressive woman, praised for the welfare, her care for the poor regardless of religion, and her works for the Jewish community in Hechingen.

In 1808, Karoline Kaulla was awarded the honor of the Civil-Verdienst-Medaille with golden chain, presented to her by Emperor Franz I, as a recognition of her financial contributions to the Imperial army.  The golden chain is now displayed at Yad Vashem historic museum in Jerusalem.

References

External links
 Karoline Kaulla, Banker (German)
 Karoline-Kaulla-Weg, a street in Stuttgart
 Guide to the Papers of the Kaulla Family

Court Jews
18th-century German Jews
People from Biberach (district)
People from Hechingen
1739 births
1809 deaths
18th-century German businesswomen
18th-century German businesspeople
19th-century German businesswomen
19th-century German businesspeople